Elizabeth George Speare (November 21, 1908 – November 15, 1994) was an American writer of children's books, best known for historical novels including two Newbery Medal winners. She has been called one of America's 100 most popular writers for children and some of her work has become mandatory reading in many schools throughout the nation. Since her books have sold so well she is cited as one of the Educational Paperback Association's top 100 authors.

Speare is one of six writers with two Newbery Medals recognizing the year's "most distinguished contribution to American literature for children".
In 1989 she received the Laura Ingalls Wilder Medal for her contributions to American children's literature.

Life

Speare was born in Melrose, Massachusetts to Harry Allan and Demetria (Simmons) George. Her childhood, as she later recalled, was "exceptionally happy" and Melrose was "an ideal place in which to have grown up, close to fields and woods where we hiked and picnicked, and near to Boston where we frequently had family treats of theaters and concerts." 

She had an extended family with one brother and many aunts, uncles, and cousins, and most importantly, very loving and supportive parents. Speare lived much of her life in New England, the setting for many of her books.

Speare discovered her gift for writing at the age of eight and began composing stories while still in high school. After completing her Bachelor of Arts degree at Smith College in 1930, she earned her Master's degree in English from Boston University and taught English at several private Massachusetts high schools from 1932 to 1936. 

In 1936, she met her future husband, Alden Speare, and together the two moved to Connecticut where they married and raised two children; Alden, Jr., who was born in 1939, and Mary in 1942. Although Speare always intended to write, the challenges and responsibilities of being a mother and wife drained her of any free time. Speare began to focus seriously on literature when her children were in junior high school.

Literary career

Speare's first published work was a magazine article about skiing with her children. She also wrote many other magazine articles based on her experiences as a mother, and even experimented with one-act plays. Eventually her work saw circulation in Better Homes and Gardens, Woman's Day, Parents, and American Heritage.

Speare's first book, Calico Captive, was published by Houghton Mifflin in 1957. It features a colonial New Hampshire family kidnapped by Native Americans in 1754. The next year she completed her second historical novel, The Witch of Blackbird Pond, which won numerous awards including the Newbery Medal. Ideas and inspiration for both books came to Speare while she was researching the history of New England and Connecticut, respectively. She earned her second Newbery Medal for her third book, The Bronze Bow, published in 1961. The Sign of the Beaver (1984) was a Newbery Honor winner, and won the Scott O'Dell Award for Historical Fiction and the Christopher Award.

Biographer Marilyn Fain Apseloff wrote, “…she is not merely a writer of escapist literature, bringing only the past to her readers; in exploring universal problems and offering timeless values, she offers them hope for the present and the future as well."  

In 1989, the professional children's librarians awarded Speare the Wilder Medal, which recognizes a living author or illustrator whose books, published in the United States, have made "a substantial and lasting contribution to literature for children". At the time it was awarded every three years.

Death
Speare died of an aortic aneurysm on November 15, 1994, aged 85, in Northwest General Hospital, in Tucson, Arizona.

Works
Calico Captive (1957)
The Witch of Blackbird Pond (1958) — Newbery Medal
The Bronze Bow (1961) — Newbery Medal
Life in Colonial America (1963)
The Prospering (1966)
The Sign of the Beaver (1983) - Newbery Honor

See also

Notes

References

External links
Internet resources for The Sign of the Beaver
Fact or Fiction: An Analysis of Historical Fiction Literature by Elizabeth George Speare 
Elizabeth George Speare at Fantastic Fiction

1908 births
1994 deaths
American children's writers
American historical novelists
Laura Ingalls Wilder Medal winners
Newbery Medal winners
Newbery Honor winners
Deaths from aortic aneurysm
20th-century American novelists
American women novelists
Women historical novelists